Dryadocoris is a genus of shield bugs belonging to the family Pentatomidae.

Species
 Dryadocoris apicalis (Herrich-Schaeffer, 1842) 
 Dryadocoris breviceps Linnavuori, 1975 
 Dryadocoris decipiens Linnavuori, 1975 
 Dryadocoris distanti (Bergroth, 1892) 
 Dryadocoris kenyalis Linnavuori, 1975

References
 Biolib
 Fauna europaea

Pentatomidae